Hopea aptera is a species of plant in the family Dipterocarpaceae. It is endemic to Papua New Guinea.

References

Trees of Papua New Guinea
aptera
Data deficient plants
Endemic flora of Papua New Guinea
Taxonomy articles created by Polbot